Donatello Stefanucci (1896–1987) was an Italian painter, active in his native Marche region, painting landscapes. A number of his works are on display in the Pinacoteca Civica of his native Cingoli. He frescoed the apse of the Cingoli Cathedral. He died in Fano.

References

1896 births
1987 deaths
People from the Province of Macerata
Italian landscape painters
20th-century Italian painters
Italian male painters
19th-century Italian male artists
20th-century Italian male artists